The 2000 season was the Jacksonville Jaguars' 6th in the National Football League and their sixth under head coach Tom Coughlin.

The Jaguars in 1999 had obtained an NFL-best record of 14–2 and thrashed the Miami Dolphins 62–7 in their divisional-round game. However, they were helped to this by an extremely easy regular-season schedule. In 2000, the Jaguars were severely hit by the loss of safety Carnell Lake for the entire season to foot surgery, and by an ultimately career-ending knee injury to right tackle Leon Searcy. Further offensive line injuries, notably to left tackle Zach Wiegert and center John Wade, crippled the Jaguars all season, with the result that after a fair start the Jaguars fell in Week 4 to five consecutive losses and were out of the running for a postseason berth by December, and thus knocking them out of the playoffs for the first time since 1995 when the franchise was first established. Ultimately the team's tally of wins was halved vis-à-vis 1999. At the close of the season, the Jaguars also had problems with being $31 million over the salary cap.

Offseason

NFL draft

Personnel

Staff

Roster

Preseason

Schedule

Regular season

Schedule 

Note: Intra-division opponents are in bold text.

Standings

Awards and records 
 Mark Brunell, AFC Offensive Player of the Week, week 9
 Mark Brunell, Franchise Record (tied), Most Touchdown Passes in One Season, 20 Passes
 Mike Hollis, Franchise Record (tied), Most Field Goals in One Game, 5 Field Goals (September 10, 2000)
 Brad Meester, PFW/PFWA All-Rookie Team
 Jimmy Smith, Franchise Record, Most Receiving Yards in One Game, 291 yards, September 10, 2000
 Fred Taylor, AFC Offensive Player of the Week, week 12
 Fred Taylor, Franchise Record, Most Rushing Yards in One Game, 234 Yards, November 19, 2000
 Fred Taylor, Franchise Record, Most Rushing Yards in One Season, 1,399 yards

Notes

References

External links 
 Jaguars on Pro Football Reference
 Jaguars Schedule on jt-sw.com

Jacksonville Jaguars
Jacksonville Jaguars seasons
Jackson